Munana is a surname. Notable people with the surname include:

Laura Munana (born 1981), American ice dancer
Luke Munana (born 1979), American ice dancer